Kiel High School is a public secondary school located in the town of Kiel, Wisconsin, United States. Kiel High School includes grades nine through twelve. The school is a part of the Kiel Area School District. The Kiel Area School District includes four public schools and approximately 1500 students. The school's mascot is the Raiders.

Enrollment 
From 2000 to 2019, high school enrollment declined 24.2%.

Enrollment at Kiel High School, 2000–2019

Notable alumni 
 Trevor Casper, former Wisconsin State Trooper
 Nicolas Hammann, race car driver
 Elmer Salzman, Brigadier general in the Marine Corps and Navy Cross recipient

References

External links 
 Kiel High School

Public high schools in Wisconsin
Schools in Manitowoc County, Wisconsin